Simon Pierre Robineau (April 8, 1882 – December 6, 1952) was an attorney, soldier and member of the Florida House of Representatives.

Early life
Born in Versailles, France, Robineau’s parents brought him to live in America as a boy. Robineau's father, Jean S. Robineau, was a surgeon and had visited military hospitals during the American Civil War.

He became a U.S. citizen when he turned 21.

Marjory Stoneman Douglas described him in her book, Voice of the River: “He was slender when I met him.  He had a long, French nose, dark eyes, a little moustache, and a humorous mouth.  He was witty, charming and well-read.”

Education
Robineau attended middle and high school near Chicago. He earned his Bachelor of Arts degree from Lake Forest College, 1907. 
He earned a Master of Arts degree from the University of the South, 1908. Robineau conducted post graduate studies at the Sorbonne and University of Freiburg in 1908, 1909.  He went on to earn an LLB from Harvard University in 1912.

Civilian career
BY 1914, Robineau was practising law in Boston.  In 1918, Robineau was a partner in the Rose & Robineau law firm in Miami. Upon returning from military service, Robineau earned appointment as Miami City Attorney.

Robineau was an early board member in the Zonite Products Corporation.

S.P won election to the Florida House of Representatives, representing Miami from 1929 through 1936.

Robineau introduced the bill in the Florida Legislature which made Stephen Foster's song, Old Folks at Home, also known as Suwanne River, the State Song in 1935.

In 1936, he served as a witness in the Senate impeachment of Judge Halstead Ritter.

Military career
During World War I but before America joined the war, Robineau fought for France. At the outset of his service in an American uniform, Robineau was an interpreter for the medical corps.   His medical training and his fluency in French helped communications between American surgeons and French medical staff at field hospitals.

Soon enough, his skills caught the attention of the military intelligence section and he was given leadership of a team of interpreters.

When World War II began, Robineau was nearly 60. He was promoted into the Army Air Corps, reaching the rank of colonel. He resumed intelligence duties, focusing on occupied France, where he served for over 30 months. In 1945 he was part of a committee that helped establish the rules and regulations for American occupied military control over Germany for the immediate post-war period. He was awarded the Purple Heart.

Fraternal and Civic Affiliations
Robineau was a member of The Florida Bar and Dade County bar associations, the Harvey W Seeds Post #29 of the American Legion, The Military Order of the World Wars, Alpha Tau Omega, Theta Nu Epsilon and Omega Psi.

He died in Miami in December 1952.

References

Sources
 
 

Florida lawyers
French military personnel of World War I
1882 births
1952 deaths
Members of the Florida House of Representatives
Lake Forest College alumni
Sewanee: The University of the South alumni
Harvard Law School alumni
20th-century American politicians
20th-century American lawyers
United States Army personnel of World War I
United States Army Air Forces personnel of World War II
United States Army Air Forces officers
Naturalized citizens of the United States
French emigrants to the United States